Sukhani  is a village in Kapurthala district of Punjab State, India. The village is administrated by a Sarpanch who is an elected representative of village as per the constitution of India and Panchayati raj (India).

Demography 
According to the report published by Census India in 2011, Sukhani has 97 houses with total population of 337 persons of which 208 are male and 165 females. Literacy rate of Sukhani is 68.44%, lower than the state average of 75.84%.  The population of children in the age group 0–6 years is 34 which is 9.12% of total population. Child sex ratio is approximately 619, lower than the state average of 846.

Population data

References

External links
  Villages in Kapurthala
 Kapurthala Villages List

Villages in Kapurthala district